In differential geometry, systolic freedom refers to the fact that closed Riemannian manifolds may have arbitrarily small volume regardless of their systolic invariants.
That is, systolic invariants or products of systolic invariants do not in general provide universal (i.e. curvature-free) lower bounds for the total volume of a closed Riemannian manifold.

Systolic freedom was first detected by Mikhail Gromov in an I.H.É.S. preprint in 1992 (which eventually appeared as ), and was further developed by Mikhail Katz, Michael Freedman and others.

Systolic freedom has applications in quantum error correction.   survey the main results on systolic freedom.

Example
The complex projective plane admits Riemannian metrics of arbitrarily small volume, such that every essential surface is of area at least 1.  Here a surface is called "essential" if it cannot be contracted to a point in the ambient 4-manifold.

Systolic constraint
The opposite of systolic freedom is systolic constraint, characterized by the presence of systolic inequalities such as Gromov's systolic inequality for essential manifolds.

References
. Astérisque 216, Exp. No. 771, 5, 279–310.
.
.
.
.
.
.

Differential geometry
Quantum information science
Riemannian geometry
Systolic geometry